Marek Zalewski (born 2 February 1963) is a Polish prelate of the Catholic Church who works in the diplomatic service of the Holy See. He has been the Apostolic Nuncio to Singapore since May 2018.

Biography
Marek Zalewski was born in Augustow, Poland, on 2 February 1963 to Jan Zalewski and Klara née Krucynska Zalewska. From 1983 to 1985 he studied at the major seminary in Łomża and from 1985 to 1989 at the metropolitan seminary in Florence, Italy. He was ordained a priest of the Diocese of Łomża on 27 May 1989.

He worked as a parish priest in Florence for two years and then completed his doctorate in canon law at the Pontifical Gregorian University in 1995 while also preparing for a diplomat's career at the Pontifical Ecclesiastical Academy. He entered the diplomatic service of the Holy See on 1 July 1995. He worked in the Central African Republic (1995-1998), at the United Nations in New York (1998-2001), in Great Britain (2001-2004), Germany (2004-2008), Thailand (2008-2011), Singapore (2011-2012), and Malaysia (2012-2014).

On 25 March 2014, Pope Francis named Zalewski titular archbishop of Africa and Apostolic Nuncio to Zimbabwe. He received his episcopal consecration from Cardinal Pietro Parolin, the Secretary of State, on 31 May.

On 21 May 2018, Pope Francis named him Apostolic Nuncio to Singapore and Non-Residential Papal Representative to Vietnam.

Notes

See also
 List of heads of the diplomatic missions of the Holy See

References

External links
 Catholic Hierarchy: Archbishop Marek Zalewski 

1963 births
Living people
People from Augustów
Pontifical Ecclesiastical Academy alumni
Polish Roman Catholic titular archbishops
Apostolic Nuncios to Singapore
Apostolic Nuncios to Zimbabwe